"Wildest Moments" is a song by British singer Jessie Ware from her debut studio album, Devotion (2012). The song was released in the United Kingdom as a digital download on 29 June 2012 to positive responses and high acclaim.

Critical reception
The song received highly positive reviews. Pitchfork Media gave the song its "Best New Music" accolade. It also featured in their Top 100 Tracks of 2012 at number 21.

Music video
A music video to accompany the release of "Wildest Moments" was first released on YouTube on 2 July 2012 at a total length of four minutes and five seconds. The video consists of a single shot of Ware sitting while singing the song, with the camera slowly rotating around her.

Track listing

Chart performance

Weekly charts

Year-end charts

Certifications

Release history

Use in other media
 "Wildest Moments" features on the second-season episode — "Re-Launch" (2012) — of New Girl, playing in the background as characters Schmidt and Cece talk at the end of the episode.
 "Wildest Moments" also features on the third-season episode — "Who I Want to Be" (2013) — of Awkward, playing in the background as characters Jenna and Matty dance together at the prom.
 "Wildest Moments" features on the show Love sick season 1 episode 2

References

2012 singles
2012 songs
Jessie Ware songs
Island Records singles
Songs written by Kid Harpoon
Songs written by Jessie Ware